"We're Going to Hang out the Washing on the Siegfried Line" is a popular song by Irish songwriter Jimmy Kennedy, written whilst he was a Captain in the British Expeditionary Force during the early stages of the Second World War, with music by Michael Carr. It was first published in 1939.

Background and composition
The Siegfried Line was a chain of fortifications along Germany's Western border, analogous to the Maginot Line in France.

At the first big wartime variety concert organized by ENSA, which was broadcast by the BBC from RAF Hendon in north London on 17 October 1939, Adelaide Hall performed the song accompanied by Mantovani and his orchestra. A rare newsreel of this concert exists, and the footage is thought to be the earliest surviving film of a performer singing the song.

The song was used as a morale-booster during the war, particularly up to and during the Battle of France.   It began:

Leslie Sarony (1897–1985) and Leslie Holmes added some possibly unofficial lines.  The Sarony and Holmes version put "Mother dear, I'm writing you from somewhere in France" at the start and then, after the main section, added four lines starting "Everybody's mucking in and doing their job".

The song was recorded by many British musicians during the Second World War, including Arthur Askey, Flanagan and Allen, and Vera Lynn.

Parody
A mocking parody was written shortly after the Battle of France by a German songwriter, with translated lines that include:

References

External links
 Jimmy Kennedy's obituary at the New York Times, April 1984
 Three Youtube versions of the song (retrieved on Oct.12th, 2020): https://www.youtube.com/watch?v=-BuetfQ3xQw
 https://www.youtube.com/watch?v=4JJEN5lwbBw
 https://www.youtube.com/watch?v=1mN8wZB8ae8

1939 songs
Songs with lyrics by Jimmy Kennedy
Flanagan and Allen songs
Songs of World War II
Songs about Germany
Songs with music by Michael Carr (composer)